José Elías Escobar Sánchez (born October 30, 1960) is a former Major League Baseball shortstop and right-handed batter who played for the Cleveland Indians (1991).

Escobar hit .200 (3-for-15) with one run batted in in 10 games.

Personal life
 Escobar is the father of pitcher Edwin Escobar, as well as the uncle of shortstop Alcides Escobar, outfielder Ronald Acuña Jr., and pitchers Kelvim Escobar and Vicente Campos.

See also
 List of Major League Baseball players from Venezuela

Sources

External links
, or Retrosheet
Pelota Binaria (Venezuelan Winter League)

1960 births
Living people
Canton-Akron Indians players
Cardenales de Lara players
Cleveland Indians players
Colorado Springs Sky Sox players
José
Florence Blue Jays players
Kinston Indians players
Knoxville Blue Jays players
Major League Baseball players from Venezuela
Major League Baseball shortstops
Omaha Royals players
People from Vargas (state)
Portland Beavers players
Reading Phillies players
Syracuse Chiefs players
Utica Blue Jays players
Venezuelan expatriate baseball players in the United States